Stephen Samuel Roach (born September 16, 1945) is an American economist. He serves as senior fellow at Yale University’s Jackson Institute for Global Affairs, and a senior lecturer at the Yale School of Management.  He was formerly chairman of Morgan Stanley Asia, and chief economist at Morgan Stanley, the New York City-based investment bank. In 2009, Dirk Bezemer, a Professor of Economics at the University of Groningen in the Netherlands, noted that Roach was one of the earliest to have predicted the 2008 global financial crisis.

Career
Roach holds a PhD in economics from New York University, and a bachelor's degree in economics from the University of Wisconsin–Madison ('68).

After earning his PhD, Roach was a research fellow at the Brookings Institution in Washington, D.C. Roach served as staff economist of the Federal Reserve Board in Washington, D.C. from 1972 until 1979, supervising the preparation of the official Federal Reserve projections of the U.S. economy.  From 1979 until joining Morgan Stanley in 1982, Roach was Vice President for Economic Analysis for the Morgan Guaranty Trust Company in New York.

Roach was with Morgan Stanley for 30-plus years. He was the investment bank's chief economist since 1982, serving as head of the firm's global team of economists in New York, London, Tokyo, Hong Kong, Singapore, and Paris. From 2007-10 he was Chairman, Morgan Stanley Asia, from 2010-12 he was Non-Executive Chairman, Morgan Stanley Asia, and since mid-2010 he has been a Senior Fellow, Yale University.

In 2009, Dirk Bezemer, a Professor of Economics at the University of Groningen in the Netherlands, noted that Roach was one of the earliest to have predicted the 2008 global financial crisis.

He also writes monthly columns for international media organization Project Syndicate.

Roach and his wife live in New Canaan, Connecticut.

Books
 Roach, Stephen, Accidental Conflict: America, China, and the Clash of False Narratives, (Yale University Press 2022) ISBN 978-0300259643
 Roach, Stephen, Unbalanced: The Codependency of America and China (2014)
 Roach, Stephen, The Next Asia: Opportunities and Challenges for a New Globalization, (Wiley 2009)

References

External links
Column archive at Project Syndicate
Column archive at The Globalist
Column archive at Aljazeera

Video of Stephen Roach discussing 'The Next Asia' at the Asia Society in New York, September 30, 2009

1945 births
20th-century American economists
21st-century American economists
Brookings Institution people
Economists from Connecticut
Federal Reserve economists
Living people
Morgan Stanley people
New York University alumni
People from New Canaan, Connecticut
University of Wisconsin–Madison College of Letters and Science alumni
Yale School of Management faculty
Yale University fellows